Federico Martínez may refer to:
Federico Martínez Roda (born 1950), Spanish history professor
Federico Martínez (footballer, born 1984), Uruguayan football forward
Federico Martínez (footballer, born 1996), Uruguayan football left midfielder